Imanta is a neighbourhood on the western edge of Riga, Latvia. The neighbourhood's northern border is Kurzeme Prospekts (Boulevard); and in the south, Imanta is separated from the newer Zolitūde neighbourhood by the Riga—Jūrmala railroad. Prior to development, the region consisted largely of pine forests, sections of which have been preserved in Anninmuiza Park in the center of Imanta, and the Kleistu forest to its north.

Neighbourhoods in Riga